The 1939 SMU Mustangs football team was an American football team that represented Southern Methodist University (SMU) as a member of the Southwest Conference (SWC) during the 1939 college football season. In their fifth season under head coach Matty Bell, the Mustangs compiled a 6–3–1 record (4–2 against conference opponents) and were outscored by a total of 118 to 60. The team played its home games at Ownby Stadium in the University Park suburb of Dallas.

Schedule

References

SMU
SMU Mustangs football seasons
SMU Mustangs football